Billy Davenport (April 23, 1931 – December 24, 1999) was an American drummer known for his work with blues musicians such as Willie Dixon, Muddy Waters, Howlin' Wolf, Otis Rush, and Paul Butterfield. He played on the Butterfield album East-West, and retired from music briefly until 1972, and then again from 1974 to 1981.

Born in Chicago, Illinois, United States, Davenport died in December 1999. He was inducted posthumously into the Rock and Roll Hall of Fame in 2015 as an early member of the Butterfield Band.

References

1931 births
1999 deaths
Musicians from Chicago
20th-century American drummers
American male drummers
Paul Butterfield Blues Band members
20th-century American male musicians